István király  is an 1886 Hungarian opera by Ferenc Erkel on King Stephen I of Hungary.

References
The following sources were given:
 Till Géza: Opera, Zeneműkiadó, Budapest, 1985, 
 Winkler Gábor: Barangolás az operák világában, Tudomány Kiadó, Budapest, 2005, 

Hungarian-language operas
Operas by Ferenc Erkel
1886 operas
Operas